Work Makes Freedom is an EP by Distorted Pony, released on September, 1991 through Bomp!. The EP was initially released as a  12" vinyl, however all of the tracks would later appear on the CD version of the band's 1992 album Punishment Room. Some versions of the record were single-sided, with the second side containing etchings of song lyrics.

Track listing

Personnel 
Theodore Jackson – drums, percussion
Dora Jahr – bass guitar, vocals
Robert Hammer – guitar, vocals on "Forensic Interest"
David Uskovich – guitar, vocals

References 

1991 EPs
Distorted Pony albums
Bomp! Records albums